The 43rd Daytime Creative Arts Emmy Awards ceremony, which honors the crafts behind American daytime television programming, was held at the Westin Bonaventure Hotel and Suites in Los Angeles on April 29, 2016. The event was presented in conjunction with the 43rd Daytime Emmy Awards by the National Academy of Television Arts and Sciences. The nominations were announced on March 24, 2016, and neither ceremony was televised.

Category and rule changes
The Academy announced some category and rule changes for the 43rd Daytime Emmy Awards, which include:
 The category New Approaches Drama Series was renamed Outstanding Digital Daytime Drama Series.
 The previous single acting category for this program type was divided into two categories, and renamed Outstanding Actress in a Digital Daytime Drama Series and Outstanding Actor in a Digital Daytime Drama Series. A performer in either a lead or supporting role was eligible to enter.
 The Academy introduced a new category, Outstanding Musical Performance in a Talk Show/Morning Program. A musical artist and the program’s production of the performance were eligible to enter for performances which occurred during the 2015 calendar year.

Winners and nominees

In the lists below, the winner of the category is in bold.

Programs

Performers

Crafts

Lifetime Achievement Award
 Frank Welker

References

043 Creative Arts
2015 television awards
2015 in American television